Michael Nunes may refer to:
 Michael Nunes (actor), American actor
 Michael Keith Nunes (1918–1996), Jamaican sailor
 Michael Anthony Nunes (born 1947), Jamaican sailor